A patronage of the Blessed Virgin Mary is a form of spiritual protection attributed to Mary, mother of Jesus, in favor of some occupations, activities, religious orders, congregations, dioceses, and geographic locations.

Occupations and activities 

The Blessed Virgin is cited as the patroness of all humanity. However, certain occupations and activities are more closely associated with her protection.

Dioceses claiming Mary as patroness

Places 

A large number of countries, places and groups claim the Blessed Virgin Mary as a patroness, though usually under a specific title or apparition while only a select few retains its patronage by Pontifical decree from Rome.

Africa
 Algeria - Our Lady of Africa
 Angola - Immaculate Heart of Mary
 Cameroon- Immaculate heart of Mary
 Ethiopia - Mother of light 
 Uganda - Mary, Queen of Africa

Asia

 Apostolic Vicariate of Northern Arabia - Our Lady of Arabia
 Kuwait - Our Lady of Arabia
 China - Mary Help of Christians
 India - Our Lady of the Assumption
 Korea - Immaculate Conception
 Andong - Immaculate Conception
 Busan - Our Lady of Rosary
 Incheon - Our Lady, Star of the Sea
 Seoul - Immaculate Conception
 Suwon - Our Lady of Peace
 Daegeon - Our Lady of Lourdes
 Daegu - Our Lady of Lourdes
 Jeju - Immaculate Conception
 Lebanon - Our Lady of Lebanon
 Philippines - Immaculate Conception - Principal patroness of the Philippines
 Baguio - Our Lady of Atonement
 Bicol Region - Our Lady of Peñafrancia (Ina ng Peñafrancia)
 Cavite province - Our Lady of Porta Vaga
 Imus City and the Diocese - Nuestra Señora del Pilar de Imus
 Silang - Our Lady of Candelaria
 Dasmariñas - Immaculate Conception

 Loboc, Bohol - Our Lady of Guadalupe in Extremadura
 Manila - Our Lady of Guidance
 Santa Ana - Nuestra Señora de los Desamparados de Manila (Our Lady of the Abandoned)
 Obando, Bulacan - Our Lady of the Immaculate Conception of Salambao
 Pampanga - Virgen de los Remedios de Pampanga (Our Lady of Remedies)
 Parañaque - (Nuestra Senora del Buen Suceso)
 Piat, Cagayan - Our Lady of Piat
 Vietnam - Our Lady of La Vang
 Quezon City - Our Lady of Hope
 Western Visayas - Our Lady of the Candles
 Cebu Province and the Archdiocese - Our Lady of Guadalupe
 Zamboanga City - Our Lady of the Pillar
 Syria - Our Lady of Damascus

The Americas
 Our Lady of Guadalupe

Caribbean 
 Jamaica - Our Lady of the Blue Mountains and Our Lady of the Assumption.
 Costa Rica - Our Lady of the Angels Cuba - Our Lady of Charity of El Cobre (Nuestra Señora de la Caridad del Cobre)
 Dominican Republic - Our Lady of Altagracia
 Haiti - Our Lady of Perpetual Help
 Puerto Rico - Our Lady of Divine Providence

Central America
 El Salvador - Our Lady of Peace (Nuestra Seňora de la Paz)
 Honduras - Our Lady of Suyapa
 Nicaragua - Our Lady of the Immaculate Conception of El Viejo
 Panama - Our Lady of La Antigua

North America
 Mexico - Our Lady of Guadalupe
 Jalisco - Our Lady of Expectation (Our Lady of Zapopan)
 United States - Patroness of the United States under her title of the Immaculate Conception
 Louisiana - Our Lady of Prompt Succor
 Mississippi - Our Lady of Sorrows
 Guam - Santa Marian Kamalen
 Canada - Notre-Dame-du-Cap

South America
 Argentina - Our Lady of Luján
 Bolivia - Virgin of Copacabana
 Brazil - Our Lady of Aparecida
 Chile - Our Lady of Carmel of the Maipú
 Colombia - Our Lady of the Rosary of Chiquinquirá
 Ecuador - Our Lady of the Presentation of El Quinche
 Guatemala - Our Lady of the Rosary -
 Paraguay - Our Lady of the Miracles of Caacupé
 Peru - Our Lady of Mercy
 Uruguay - The Virgin of the Thirty Three (La Virgen de los Treinta y Tres)
 Venezuela - Our Lady of Coromoto
 Zulia - Our Lady of the Rosary of Chiquinquirá

 Australia / Oceania 
 Our Lady Help of Christians
 New Zealand - Our Lady of the AssumptionSamoa - Our Lady Star of the Sea

Europe
 Albania - Our Lady of Good Counsel
 Andorra - Our Lady of Meritxell
 Austria - Our Lady of Mariazell
 Azerbaijan - The Virgin Mary, Protector of Caucasus 
 Belgium - Our Lady of Beauraing
 Croatia - Mother of Goodness
 England - Our Lady of Walsingham
 Germany Bavaria - Our Lady of Altötting
 Greece Tinos - Our Lady of Great Grace or Evangelistria (Our Lady of Good Tidings)
 Ireland - Our Lady of Knock
 Italy Castellammare del Golfo, Sicily - Our Lady of Prompt Succor
 Rome - Salus Populi Romani
 Lithuania - Our Lady of the Gate of Dawn
 Luxembourg - Our Lady, Comforter of the Afflicted
 Malta - Blessed Virgin of Ta' Pinu
 Netherlands - Our Lady, Star of the Sea
 Poland - The Most Holy Virgin Mary, Queen of Poland (also as Our Lady of Częstochowa or Bogurodzica) 
 Portugal - Our Lady of Fátima
 Republic of Macedonia Skopje - Mother of God
 Russia - Our Lady of Kazan
 Slovakia - Our Lady of Sorrows
 Spain - Our Lady of the Pillar
 Almoradí - Our Lady of Perpetual Help
 Asturias - Our Lady of Covadonga
 Barcelona - Our Lady of Ransom
 Biscay - Our Lady of Begoña
 Catalonia - Virgin of Montserrat
 Canary Islands - Virgin of Candelaria
 Extremadura  - Our Lady of Guadalupe (Extremadura)
 Trujillo, Cáceres - Virgen de la Victoria (Our Lady of Victory)
 Switzerland - Our Lady of the Hermits
 United Kingdom Gibraltar - Our Lady of Europe
Outer space
 Moon''' - Mary is the patroness of the Roman Catholic Diocese of Orlando, which Bishop William Donald Borders claimed included the moon because of a technicality in the 1917 Code of Canon Law.

Religious groups

 Carmelites and Discalced Carmelites - Our Lady of Mount Carmel
 Congregation of Holy Cross - Our Lady of Sorrows
 Sisters of the Holy Cross - Immaculate Heart of Mary
 Congregation of the Holy Ghost - Immaculate Heart of Mary
 Congregation of the Sacred Hearts of Jesus and Mary - Our Lady of Peace
 Franciscan Sisters of the Immaculate Heart of Mary - Immaculate Heart of Mary
 Missionary Sisters of Saint Peter Claver Our Lady of Good Counsel
 Order of Preachers (Dominicans)
 Order of the Blessed Virgin Mary of Mercy - Our Lady of Ransom
 Servite Order - Our Lady of Sorrows
 Jesuits - Madonna Della Strada
 Schoenstatt Apostolic Movement - Mother Thrice Admirable
 Order of the Brothers of Our Lady of Bethlehem (Bethlehemite)

See also 
 Our Lady of the Thirty-Three
 Patron saints of ailments, illness and dangers
 Patron saints of occupations and activities
 Patron saints of places
 Titles of Mary

References 

Catholic Mariology
Catholic Church-related lists
Blessed Virgin Mary